Food Republic is a food court chain run by the BreadTalk Group based in Singapore. CEO of Food Republic is Mr. Jenson Ong.

The concept combines local hawker fare with mini restaurants (some of which have exclusive seating) in an open dining concept. Some stalls are also run from standalone pushcarts. Food Republic's elaborate decor and furniture are designed to invoke a nostalgic kampong atmosphere.

Locations
There are currently fourteen branches in Singapore, which are open at Wisma Atria, 313@Somerset, VivoCity, Suntec City, NEX, Parkway Parade, City Square, BreadTalk IHQ, Causeway Point, Westgate, Shaw House, Manulife and Capitol Piazza. In addition, the group operates a food court by the name of Food Opera at ION Orchard together with Tea Loft with high prices that have attracted much attention by the media and the general public.

The Wisma Atria branch seats 900 people while the VivoCity one is slightly bigger and also has a Toast Box outlet attached.

The chain also has five branches in Hong Kong, which are located at Plaza Hollywood in Diamond Hill, Citygate Outlets in Tung Chung, Silvercord in Tsim Sha Tsui, Domain (Hong Kong) in Yau Tong and Olympian City in Tai Kok Tsui. Silvercord branch and Olympian City branch also have Toast Box outlets attached. Toast Box also has branches located at the basement level of Times Square in Causeway Bay and On Shing Terrace of Taikoo Shing. BreadTalk has also had a branch in Viva Beijing, Beijing, at which breadtalk is directly connected to.

There is also a branch located at the basement level of Pavilion Kuala Lumpur, in Malaysia.

In Thailand, Food Republic has three branches in Bangkok, located on the sixth floor of CentralPlaza Grand Rama IX, Mega Bangna and the fourth floor of Siam Center.

In 2012, Food Republic opened three branches in Taiwan: in Banchiao, Taipei City, and Kaohsiung. The most recent of the three opened in Taipei in the first floor of the Carrefour building in Neihu.

In 2016, Food Republic opened a branch in Disneytown, which is a shopping district in Shanghai Disney Resort.

In 2017, Food Republic opened 2 branches at ShenZhen, China

Gallery

External links

Food Republic Official Site
Channelnewsasia article on opening

Regional restaurant chains
Fast-food chains of Singapore
Food court in Singapore
Singaporean brands